Happiness is an EP by the former lead singer of The Inspiral Carpets Tom Hingley. It was released in March 2002 on Newmemorabila. The EP comprises tracks recorded with Radio 2, early versions of Soulfire tracks and a previously unreleased track.

Track listing
"Happiness"
"Isolation Tank (acoustic version from Janice Long Radio 2 session)"
"Port In A Storm (original version)"
"Soul Fire (1996 electric version)"
"Mine (previously unreleased)"

External links
Townsend Records

2002 EPs
Tom Hingley albums